Judith Henry (born 16 May 1968) is a French actress. She has appeared in more than forty films and TV series since 1982.

Selected filmography

Awards
César Award for Most Promising Actress (1991)

References

External links

 
 

1968 births
Living people
French film actresses
French television actresses
Actresses from Paris
French stage actresses
Most Promising Actress César Award winners
20th-century French actresses
21st-century French actresses